A hat-trick (commonly known as a hat trick), in various sports, means achieving three goals, three wickets in three deliveries, etc. in a single match.

Hat trick, hat-trick or hattrick may refer to:
"Hat Trick" (Once Upon a Time), an episode of ABC's 2011 fantasy drama Once Upon a Time
Hattrick (video game), online football management game
Hat-trick (magic trick), a classic magic trick in which an object is produced from an apparently empty stovepipe hat
Hattrick (film), a 2007 Bollywood film
"Hat Trick" (The Mighty B! episode)
Hat Trick (America album), 1973
Hat Trick (Jackie McLean album), 1996
Hat Trick Productions, British comedy television production company
Hat Trick (video game), 1984 arcade game based on the sport of ice hockey
Hat Trick Hero, arcade game, a variant of Football Champ
Hat manipulation, a form of juggling using a brimmed hat